Roderick Bajada (born 4 January 1983 in Ħamrun, Malta) is a retired professional footballer who played as a midfielder.

Playing career

Ħamrun Spartans
Roderick began his career playing for his hometown club of Hamrun Spartans during the 2000–01 season. During his debut season, Bajada made six appearances, but failed to score, as Hamrun Spartans finished in 6th position in the Maltese Premier League.

Bajada went into the 2001–02 season and established himself as first team regular in the Hamrun Spartans squad. He helped the team to another 6th-place finish in the Maltese Premier League, making 19 appearances but again failing to find the net.

The 2002–03 season was Roderick's third season with Hamrun Spartans, the club slipped into the relegation pool, but managed to finish the season in 7th position, with Bajada making 24 appearances and scoring two goals.

Roderick's last season with Hamrun Spartans was the 2003–04 season. He 23 appearances and scored two goals, but unfortunately Hamrun Spartans finished rock bottom of the Premier League in 10th position, and were condemned to relegation to the Maltese First Division.

Msida Saint-Joseph
Following the relegation of Hamrun Spartans, Bajada joined Msida Saint-Joseph for the 2004–05 season. He helped his new club narrowly avoid relegation with an 8th-place finish in the Premier League that season, making 18 appearances and scoring two goals.

The 2005–06 was Roderick's second season with Msida Saint-Joseph, it also turned out to be his final season with the club, as he left during the January transfer window of 2006, he made 12 appearances, scoring four goals. Msida Saint-Joseph went on to 6th finish the season in position in the Premier League that season.

Sliema Wanderers
Roderick Bajada joined Sliema Wanderers from Msida Saint-Joseph for the second part of the 2005–06 season. It was almost the perfect finish to a season, but the club narrowly missed out on the title to Birkirkara by two points, as the club finished in 2nd position. Bajada made 13 appearances and scored one goal.

Roderick's first full season with Sliema Wanderers was the 2006–07 season. Sliema Wanderers recorded another 2nd-place finish, but were well beaten in the race for the title as winners Marsaxlokk finished 11 points clear of their nearest rivals, Bajada made 26 appearances and scored four goals throughout the season.

For the 2007–08 season, Roderick again made the first team on a regular basis, as Sliema Wanderers finished in a disappointing 4th place by their own high standards, and Bajada again making 26 appearances and scoring four goals.

Roderick continued to be an integral part of the Sliema Wanderers squad. Bajada made a total of 25 appearances and scored one goal for the 2008–09 season, and although the team finished 5th in the Premier League, Roderick helped the club win the U*Bet FA Trophy, as they defeated Valletta in the final on penalties to win the trophy.

After being scouted by an unknown young football talent for a school project in three games at the end of 2011 including Floriana, Marsasxlokk and Mqabba, he has been fantastic. Moreover, he has been scoring goals for The Blues in order to preserve their mid table battles.

Marsaxlokk
During the close season Sliema Wanderers signed Clayton Failla and Ryan Fenech, leaving Bajada's first team opportunities limited, he decided to join Marsaxlokk on a season long loan, his new club were due to start this season in the Premier League, however following a guilty verdict on corruption case from the previous season, Marsaxlokk were demoted to the Maltese First Division. Roderick carried on the 2009–10 season in the First Division with his new club.

Valletta
In January he joined Valletta on a loan from Sliema Wanderers. He also became a Physics Teacher at Zokrija School.

Tarxien Rainbows
On 27 August 2012, he joined Tarxien Rainbows on a free transfer.

Honours

Sliema Wanderers
 2009 Maltese Cup

Marsaxlokk
 2009/10 Maltese First Division

Career statistics
Statistics accurate as of match played 1 August 2009.

External links
 Roderick Bajada at MaltaFootball.com
 

Living people
1983 births
Maltese footballers
Malta international footballers
Ħamrun Spartans F.C. players
Msida Saint-Joseph F.C. players
Sliema Wanderers F.C. players
Marsaxlokk F.C. players
Valletta F.C. players
Tarxien Rainbows F.C. players
Qormi F.C. players
Pembroke Athleta F.C. players
Żebbuġ Rangers F.C. players
Maltese Premier League players
Association football midfielders